29292 Conniewalker, provisional designation , is a bright, stony Phocaea asteroid and slow tumbler from the inner regions of the asteroid belt, approximately 4.6 kilometers in diameter. It was discovered on 24 May 1993, by American astronomer Carolyn Shoemaker and Canadian astronomer David Levy at the Palomar Observatory in California, United States.

Orbit and classification 

Conniewalker is a member of the Phocaea family of stony asteroids. It orbits the Sun in the inner main-belt at a distance of 1.9–2.8 AU once every 3 years and 7 months (1,314 days). Its orbit has an eccentricity of 0.20 and an inclination of 26° with respect to the ecliptic. A first precovery was obtained at the Siding Spring Observatory in 1983, extending the body's observation arc by 10 years prior to its official discovery observation.

Physical characteristics

Rotation period 

In 2011, rotational lightcurves of Conniewalker were obtained at the Via Capote Observatory in California  and at the Ondřejov Observatory in the Czech Republic. Lightcurve analysis gave a rotation period of 30.5 and 30.6 hours, with a brightness amplitude of 0.63 and 0.62 magnitude, respectively.

Conniewalker is a tumbler. The non-principal axis rotation (NPAR) has been observed during 22 sessions over a 46-day period. The slow tumbler had previously been a target in ASU's Photometric Survey for Asynchronous Binary Asteroids.

Diameter and albedo 

According to the survey carried out by the NEOWISE mission of NASA's Wide-field Infrared Survey Explorer, Conniewalker measures 4.581 kilometers in diameter and has a bright surface albedo of 0.367. The Collaborative Asteroid Lightcurve Link adopts the revised WISE-data by Petr Pravec, that is, an albedo of 0.3097 and a diameter of 4.571 kilometers with an absolute magnitude of 13.10.

Naming 

This minor planet was named in honor of American astronomer Connie Walker (born 1957), who has examined the formation of stars in galaxies in varying stages of development. She is well known for the educational Project Astro-Tucson and her successful work in astronomy with children and young adults in Arizona. The official naming citation was published by the Minor Planet Center on 7 January 2004.

Notes

References

External links 
 Asteroid Lightcurve Database (LCDB), query form (info )
 Dictionary of Minor Planet Names, Google books
 Asteroids and comets rotation curves, CdR – Observatoire de Genève, Raoul Behrend
 Discovery Circumstances: Numbered Minor Planets (25001)-(30000) – Minor Planet Center
 
 

029292
Discoveries by Carolyn S. Shoemaker
Discoveries by David H. Levy
Named minor planets
19930524